The 1991 Liga Semi-Pro Divisyen 1 season is the third season of Liga Semi-Pro Divisyen 1. A total of 10 teams participated in the season.

Terengganu and Kelantan were promoted from 1990 Liga Semi-Pro Divisyen 2.

Under the new format, only the top six teams in Divisyen 1 and the Divisyen 2 champions and runners-up will be involved in the Malaysia Cup. Malaysia Cup was played from the quarter-final stage, scheduled for November after the league was finished. The Malaysia Cup quarter-final and semi-final matches will be played on a home and away basis.

The season kicked off on 27 April 1991. Johor ended up the season by winning the title.

Teams
10 teams competing in the third season of Liga Semi-Pro Divisyen 1.

 Johor (1991 Liga Semi-Pro Divisyen 1 champions)
 Pahang
 Perak
 Kuala Lumpur
 Selangor
 Terengganu
 Sabah
 Singapore (1991 MSPFL relegation play-off)
 Kedah (Relegated to Liga Semi-Pro Divisyen 2)
 Kelantan  (Relegated to Liga Semi-Pro Divisyen 2)

League Table:-

1.Johor  - 22 PTS (1991 Liga Semi-Pro Divisyen 1 champions)

2.Pahang  - 21 PTS

3.Perak  - 20 PTS

4.Kuala Lumpur  - 20 PTS

5.Selangor  - 19 PTS

6.Terengganu  - 18 PTS

7.Sabah  - 18 PTS

8.Singapore  - 14 PTS (1991 Liga Semi-Pro relegation play-off) (Stay)

9.Kedah  - 11 PTS (Relegated to 1992 Liga Semi-Pro Divisyen 2)

10.Kelantan  - 11 PTS (Relegated to 1992 Liga Semi-Pro Divisyen 2)

Champions

References

Liga Semi-Pro Divisyen 1 seasons
1
Malaysia